15258 Alfilipenko, provisional designation , is a carbonaceous background asteroid from the outer region of the asteroid belt, approximately 12 kilometers in diameter. It was discovered on 15 September 1990, by Russian–Ukraininan astronomer Lyudmila Zhuravleva at the Crimean Astrophysical Observatory, Nauchnyj, on the Crimean peninsula. The asteroid was named after Russian civil engineer Aleksandr Filipenko.

Orbit and classification 

Alfilipenko orbits the Sun in the outer main-belt at a distance of 2.7–3.8 AU once every 5 years and 10 months (2,132 days). Its orbit has an eccentricity of 0.17 and an inclination of 7° with respect to the ecliptic. No precoveries were taken. The asteroid's observation arc begins with its official discovery observation.

Physical characteristics

Lightcurves 

A rotational lightcurve of Alfilipenko was obtained from photometric observations made at the U.S. Palomar Transient Factory in October 2013. Lightcurve analysis gave a rotation period of  hours with a brightness variation of 0.11 magnitude.

Diameter and albedo 

According to the survey carried out by the NEOWISE mission of NASA's space-based Wide-field Infrared Survey Explorer, Alfilipenko measures 12.1 kilometers in diameter and its surface has an albedo of 0.084, while the Collaborative Asteroid Lightcurve Link assumes a standard albedo for carbonaceous asteroids of 0.057 and calculates a diameter of 11.3 kilometers with an absolute magnitude of 13.46.

Naming 

This minor planet was named in honour of Russian civil engineer Aleksandr Vasil'evich Filipenko (born 1950) from Khanty-Mansiysk, Siberia. He is the chairman of a charitable foundation for the memory of Alexander Danilovich Menshikov (1673–1729), after whom the minor planet 3889 Menshikov is named. The official naming citation was published by the Minor Planet Center on 13 July 2004.

References

External links 
 Asteroid Lightcurve Database (LCDB), query form (info )
 Dictionary of Minor Planet Names, Google books
 Asteroids and comets rotation curves, CdR – Observatoire de Genève, Raoul Behrend
 Discovery Circumstances: Numbered Minor Planets (15001)-(20000) – Minor Planet Center
 
 

015258
Discoveries by Lyudmila Zhuravleva
Named minor planets
19900915